is a railway station on the Kintetsu Utsube Line in Yokkaichi, Mie Prefecture, Japan, operated by the private railway operator Kintetsu. It is 4.3 rail kilometers from the terminus of the line at Kintetsu-Yokkaichi Station.

Lines
Kintetsu
Utsube Line

Layout
Oiwake Station has a side platform serving bi-directional traffic. The station is unattended.

Platforms

Adjacent stations

Surrounding area
Hinaga Fork:  Ancient road fork between the Tōkaidō (to Kyoto) and the Sangūdō (to Ise Grand Shrine)
Yokkaichi-Minami Junior High School
Kaisei Junior and Senior High School

History
Oiwake Station was opened on June 21, 1922 as a station on the Mie Railway. On February 11, 1944, due to mergers, the station came under the ownership of Sanco. On February 1, 1964 the Railway division of Sanco split off and formed a separate company, the Mie Electric Railway, which merged with Kintetsu on April 1, 1965.

References

External links

 Kintetsu: Oiwake Station

Railway stations in Japan opened in 1922
Railway stations in Mie Prefecture